Western Reserve Hospital is a hospital in Cuyahoga Falls, Ohio, and it is the only physician-owned hospital in Northeast Ohio. Western Reserve Hospital's stated mission is to be "all about the patient," and the hospital has won a number of awards and accreditation for patient care and its commitment to the Northeast Ohio community.

As a full service hospital, Western Reserve offers general and acute care services, including a 24/7 emergency department. Western Reserve Hospital is also a teaching facility sponsoring graduate medical education programs in osteopathic medicine. The hospital is a majority physician-owned venture of Western Reserve Hospital Partners with a collaboration of more than 200 physicians including primary care physicians, surgeons and specialists.

Distinctive Healthcare Services
Lung Health Program

Western Reserve Hospital offers comprehensive treatment for smokers. Administered by Certified Tobacco Treatment Specialists (CTTS), the Lung Health Program uses a variety of services to assist people who wish to overcome their nicotine addiction and acquire the skills and knowledge necessary to live a tobacco-free life. The hospital also makes use of low-cost and low-dose CT scans, which are able to identify lung cancers at an early stage.

Center for Pain Medicine

The Western Reserve Hospital Center for Pain Medicine is a nationally recognized authority on chronic pain treatment. The physicians offer advanced, minimally invasive procedures and state-of-the-art technology to pinpoint the source of pain and provide effective treatment without relying heavily on prescription pain medications. The Center for Pain Medicine uses a variety of disciplines to treat pain, including four fellowship-trained physicians, an integrated behavioral health team to help patients heal emotionally, chiropractic care and a dedicated pharmacist to monitor potential drug interactions.

Discharge Pharmacy

Western Reserve Hospital is also home to a variety of pharmacy services, including New Choice Pharmacy, which delivers medications to the bedside for patients leaving the hospital. In 2016, the pharmacy at Western Reserve Hospital was the first in Northeast Ohio to begin dispensing Narcan, an anti-narcotic, without a prescription. 

Urgent Care at Western Reserve Hospital

Western Reserve Hospital owns and manages the Stow Urgent Care facility, where patients receive care for a variety of healthcare needs, including: sore throat; cough or earache; sprains, strains or broken bones; cuts, scrapes and rashes; allergies and infections; and many other conditions.

Community Partnerships
Doctor's Order

The Western Reserve Hospital Doctor's Order Program is an exclusive partnership between Western Reserve Hospital and community restaurants. Under the program, physicians and nutritionists from the hospital work with local restaurants to identify and label physician-approved healthy options on each restaurant's menu. The Doctor's Order program, which began in 2014, now features more than 30 restaurants.

The hospital also launched its own line of Doctor's Order products, which include a Super Food Protein Bar and healthy chicken noodle soup, which is given for free to all patients leaving the hospital after outpatient procedures.

Not Me, I'm Drug Free

The Cuyahoga Falls community came together in 2014 to launch “Not Me, I’m Drug Free,” an anti-drug campaign that unites the Mayor's office, Cuyahoga Falls and Woodridge school districts, police department, fire department, community businesses and Western Reserve Hospital in an effort to curb drug abuse — especially methamphetamine and heroin — in Cuyahoga Falls.

The “Not Me, I’m Drug Free” campaign is designed to educate Cuyahoga Falls-area elementary school students about the dangers of using methamphetamine and heroin via such means as Facebook, yard signs, posters, T-shirts, and incentive cards. The initiative was launched on May 28, 2014, at an event held at DeWitt Elementary School, where Mayor Walters, Western Reserve Hospital President and CEO Dr. Kent, Police Chief Jack Davis, Fire Chief Paul Moledor, Cuyahoga Falls City Schools Superintendent Dr. Todd Nichols and Woodridge Schools Superintendent Walter Davis all spoke to the students, parents and community. Students and families who abstain from drugs can take advantage of the ‘Free’-wards incentive card, which offers savings on food and family activities in and around Cuyahoga Falls.

Envelope of Life

In 2015, Western Reserve Hospital partnered with the City of Cuyahoga Falls to launch the Envelope of Life, a packet of forms and documents that puts vital information, medications and medical history immediately into the hands of first responders during an emergency. In this way, first responders can make informed decisions about how to care for someone without relying on the person, who may be incapacitated or confused in the wake of their emergency. The Envelope of Life comes with a magnetic pouch that can be placed on the refrigerator at home, or can be placed in the glove-compartment for vehicle emergencies.

History
Western Reserve Hospital was founded in 1943 as Green Cross Hospital, and in 1978 the name was changed to Cuyahoga Falls General Hospital. In 2001, the hospital became a member of Summa Health Systems. It is a charter member of the Centers of Osteopathic Research and Education, and is fully accredited by the Healthcare Facilities Accreditation Program. In 2009, Cuyahoga Falls General Hospital became Western Reserve Hospital as the result of a joint venture between Summa, who became a minority partner, and Western Reserve Hospital Partners, a group of about 200 physicians who assumed majority ownership and control of the hospital.

In 2015, Summa Health Systems, which owns a 40% stake in the hospital, sued to keep its partnership with the hospital after the doctors who owned a majority stake in the hospital allegedly removed members of Summa from the hospital board. The partnership entered into dispute when it was alleged by the doctors that Summa was violating terms of the agreement when they entered into a deal in 2013 with HealthSpan Partners. According to Western Reserve Hospital Partners, by giving minority ownership to HealthSpan, Western Reserve Hospital was limited in where it could offer its services.

References

External links

Hospitals in Ohio
Cuyahoga Falls, Ohio
1943 establishments in Ohio
Western Reserve, Ohio